Pujut National Secondary School is a public secondary school in Miri, a city in the Malaysian state of Sarawak. The school is a national secondary school, a type of government secondary school in which Malay is the main medium of instruction.

References

External links 
 Pujut National Secondary School official blog page 
 Pujut National Secondary School on www.sekolahmy.com 

National secondary schools in Malaysia
Secondary schools in Sarawak